Horní Dvořiště is a municipality and village in Český Krumlov District in the South Bohemian Region of the Czech Republic. It has about 500 inhabitants.

Administrative parts
The village of Český Heršlák is an administrative part of Horní Dvořiště.

References

External links

Villages in Český Krumlov District
Bohemian Forest